Ka'ibah also spelled Kaeebeh, is a village in northern Aleppo Governorate, northwestern Syria.

Administratively the village belongs to Nahiya Akhtarin in A'zaz District. Nearby localities include Ghurur  to the west, and al-Burj  to the southeast, in the northern Aqil mountains. In the 2004 census, Ka'ibah had a population of 572.

References

Populated places in Azaz District
Villages in Aleppo Governorate